Milecastle 43 (Great Chesters) was a milecastle on Hadrian's Wall. It was obliterated when the fort at Great Chesters (Aesica) was built.

Description
Milecastle 43 was situated at Great Chesters, and was destroyed when the Aesica fort was built.

Excavations
The foundations were discovered during an excavation in 1939, and were found beneath the fort wall and rampart between the north gate and north-west angle of Aesica. The excavations showed that the milecastle had a short axis with a Type I gateway. There are no visible remains.

Associated turrets 
Each milecastle on Hadrian's Wall had two associated turret structures. These turrets were positioned approximately one-third and two-thirds of a Roman mile to the west of the Milecastle, and would probably have been manned by part of the milecastle's garrison. The turrets associated with Milecastle 43 are known as Turret 43A and Turret 43B.

Turret 43A
Turret 43A (Cockmount Hill) was located by exploratory excavation in 1912. The site is overlain by turf-covered spoil from the Wall, and no remains of the turret can be seen.

Turret 43B
Turret 43B (Allolee East) was also located by exploratory excavation in 1912. There are no visible remains.

Public access
The Hadrian's Wall Path passes through the remains of Aesica fort close to the location of the milecastle.  The sites of both turrets are accessible via the Hadrian's Wall Path.

See also
Allolee to Walltown SSSI

References

43